This is the discography for Japanese boy band KAT-TUN.

Albums

Studio albums

Mini-albums

Compilation albums

Singles

Digital singles

NOTE: 
All of the singles that were released from 2006 until 2016, except for the song Bounce Girl, were included in the first two discs of all the versions of the compilation album titled KAT-TUN 10TH ANNIVERSARY BEST "10Ks!". Bounce Girl was only included in the Disc 3 of the 1st Limited Version of the said compilation album as part of the selected songs by KAT-TUN fans.

Videos

References

External links

Discographies of Japanese artists
Pop music group discographies